This is a list of properties and districts in Oconee County, Georgia that are listed on the National Register of Historic Places (NRHP).

Current listings

|}

References

Oconee
Buildings and structures in Oconee County, Georgia